The Grant Range Wilderness is a protected wilderness area in the Grant Range of Nye County, in the central section of the state of Nevada in the western United States.

Grant Range Wilderness is separated only by a dirt road from the smaller Quinn Canyon Wilderness to the south.

See also
 Nevada Wilderness Areas
 List of wilderness areas in Nevada

References

External links 
 Humboldt-Toiyabe National Forest webpage
 Nevada Wilderness.org
 Wilderness.net

Humboldt–Toiyabe National Forest
Wilderness areas of Nevada
Protected areas of Nye County, Nevada
Protected areas established in 1989
1989 establishments in Nevada